Iberis amara, called wild candytuft, rocket candytuft and bitter candytuft, is a species of flowering plant in the family Brassicaceae, native to Belgium, France, Germany, Great Britain, Italy, Spain, and Switzerland. It has been introduced to numerous locations including Algeria, Sweden, Eastern Europe, the Caucasus, Iraq, Kazakhstan, the Indian Subcontinent, Korea, Far Eastern Russia, New Zealand, Argentina, Ecuador, Hispaniola, the United States, and Canada. It prefers to grow in warm and sunny conditions, in high-calcium soil.

Description
Its stems are more or less hairy below and glabrous above, with leaves scattered along their lengths. All are more or less sparsely dentate towards their apices.

The ebracteate inflorescence is a lax racemose corymb, bearing 10 to 30 flowers, and elongating to  when in fruit. There are four petals, which in wildtype individuals are white or pale violet, with cultivated varieties available in deeper shades of pink, violet or fuchsia.

The petals are prominently unequal, with the outer two nearly twice as long as the sepals.

The suborbicular siliculae (fruit) are typically , reaching  in diameter, with deeply notched apices, and wings which widen somewhat towards the top. The styles are as long as or slightly exceed the apical notch, with valves that have reticulate veins.

References

amara
Garden plants of Europe
Flora of Great Britain
Flora of Spain
Flora of France
Flora of Belgium
Flora of Germany
Flora of Switzerland
Flora of Italy
Taxa named by Carl Linnaeus
Plants described in 1753